Yenal Tuncer (born 28 April 1985) is a Turkish footballer. He is a left defender and winger.

Honours 
Bursaspor
Süper Lig (1): 2009–10

References

1985 births
Living people
Turkish footballers
Association football defenders
Denizli Belediyespor footballers
Bursaspor footballers
Antalyaspor footballers
Samsunspor footballers
Denizlispor footballers
Mersin İdman Yurdu footballers
Karşıyaka S.K. footballers
Gaziantep F.K. footballers
Pendikspor footballers
Süper Lig players
TFF First League players
TFF Second League players